Frances Minturn Howard (March 15, 1905 New York City – July 23, 1995 Boston) was an American poet.

Life
She studied sculpture in Italy.

In 1957, she met and corresponded with May Sarton.
In 1959, Sylvia Plath came to dinner.

She was published in Virginia Quarterly Review, Saturday Review, AGNI, The New Yorker, Poetry Magazine,

She was married to Thomas Clark Howard and lived at 46 Mount Vernon Street. Beacon Hill, Boston. Earlier in their marriage, they had lived in New York City and Providence, Rhode Island. They also maintained a summer house on Rhode Island Avenue, in Newport, Rhode Island.

Awards
 1955 Golden Rose Award
 1957 Reynolds Lyric Award

Works

Poetry

Anthologies

Non-fiction

References

1905 births
1995 deaths
American women poets
20th-century American poets
20th-century American women writers
People from Beacon Hill, Boston
People from New York City
People from Providence, Rhode Island
American expatriates in Italy